Emilio Correa Bayeux Júnior (born October 12, 1985) is a Cuban amateur boxer best known for winning the middleweight Gold medal at the 2007 Pan American Games. He is the son of Olympic champion Emilio Correa Sr.

Career
In 2004 he lost in the welterweight final of the World Junior Championships to Elshod Rasulov by stoppage and finished third at the national senior championships.

In 2005 he moved up to middleweight and won the national championships and at the World Championships he won a bronze after losing to Russian star Matvey Korobov.

In 2006 he lost the final of the national championships to veteran Yordanis Despaigne.

At the PanAm Games 2007 he knocked out American Shawn Porter, outpointed Marco Periban 34:10, beat Carlos Góngora 21:13 in the semis and Argenis Nunez 22:5 in the final.

He has reached the 2008 Middleweight Olympic final where he lost bout for gold against Great Britain's James DeGale. The bout would have gone to countback had he not bitten DeGale, for which he was penalized 2 points.

At the 2011 World Amateur Boxing Championships he was upset by Romanian Bogdan Juratoni.

At the 2012 Olympic qualifier  he was disqualified in his first bout and therefore didn't participate in the London games.

Olympic results 
2008
Defeated Jarrod Fletcher (Australia) 17-4
Defeated Sergiy Derevyanchenko (Ukraine) 18-4
Defeated Elshod Rasulov (Uzbekistan) 9-7
Defeated Vijender Singh (India) 8-5
Lost to James DeGale 14-16

References

External links
 PanAm results 2007

1985 births
Living people
Cuban male boxers
Middleweight boxers
Olympic boxers of Cuba
Olympic silver medalists for Cuba
Olympic medalists in boxing
Boxers at the 2008 Summer Olympics
Medalists at the 2008 Summer Olympics
Pan American Games gold medalists for Cuba
Pan American Games medalists in boxing
Boxers at the 2007 Pan American Games
Boxers at the 2011 Pan American Games
AIBA World Boxing Championships medalists
Medalists at the 2007 Pan American Games
Medalists at the 2011 Pan American Games